Cable News Network Chile (known as CNN Chile and abbreviated as CNN CL) is a Chilean pay television news channel launched on 4 December 2008. It was originally a joint venture between VTR Chile and Warner Bros. Discovery. The channel is based in Santiago, Chile.

It is the local version of popular TV news channel CNN, which had previously shown interest in the Chilean market when it covered the 2005 presidential elections through CNN en Español.

History

The news channel is partnered with free-to-air network Chilevisión since 2010, when Turner Broadcasting System purchased it for $145 million to Sebastian Piñera's family.

Since 2016, it is completely owned by Turner Broadcasting System Latin America as VTR sold its participation in the channel to them.

Programming

Notable current on-air staff
 Mónica Rincón – weekdays on CNN Prime, Fridays on Conciencia Inclusiva
 Daniel Matamala – weekdays on CNN Prime
 Sebastián Aguirre – weekdays on Mañana en Directo, Tuesdays on Nuevas Voces
 Viviana Encina – weekdays on Es Noticia
 Matilde Burgos – weekdays on Noticias y Perspectivas and CNN íntimo
 Verónica Schmidt – weekdays on Noticias Express

Controversies

2019 advertisement pulling controversy
During 2019, businessman Juan Sutil and food company Agrosuper decided to pull their ads, including some of Agrosuper's brand Super Pollo, from CNN Chile and from Chilevision, purportedly because of a CNN Chile show named "Agenda Agricola", which has shown videos of anti-government protests.

References

External links 

 

CNN
Warner Bros. Discovery networks
Television stations in Chile
Television networks in Chile
Television channels and stations established in 2008
Spanish-language television stations
Companies based in Santiago
Chilean news websites